EUTM-Moz (European Union Training Mission in Mozambique) is a European Union multinational military training mission headquartered in Maputo, Mozambique.

10 EU members (Portugal, Greece, Italy, Finland, Romania, Spain, Belgium, Lithuania, Austria and Estonia) are engaged in this mission and have sent soldiers to the Republic of Mozambique.

Mandates 
The decision to create EUTM-Moz was first adopted by the European Council at a meeting in July 2021 and it was requested by the Mozambican Government. The goal of the mission is to provide training and support to the Mozambican Armed Forces in order to protect civilian populations and restore security in the Cabo Delgado Province. The mission will end two years after full operational capacity is achieved. It has a budget of €15.16 million.

Objectives 
The mission will train 11 companies: 5 companies of Mozambican Navy marines in Katembe and 6 companies of Mozambican Army Special Forces in Chimoio with the goal of equipping the Mozambican Armed Forces with a capable Quick Reaction Force with around a total of 1,100 soldiers undergoing training during the entire mission. To do so, it will provide:

 Military training including operational preparation
 Specialised training, including on counterterrorism
 Training and education on the protection of civilians and compliance with international humanitarian law  and human rights law, including specific training on Women, Peace and Security

The EUTM Mozambique Mission builds on the existing Portuguese Army Training Mission, first created in January 2021, with the goal of training Mozambican special forces, marines and quick reaction forces, in response to the Cabo Delgado Crisis.

EU Mission Force Commander of EUTM Mozambique 

 1st Commander - Brigadier General Nuno Lemos Pires (Portugal) (from 3 November 2021 to present)

References

External links 

 EUTM Mozambique

2021 in Mozambique
2021 in the European Union
Military of Mozambique
Military operations involving Portugal
Military operations involving Romania